The Spotted Pig was a gastropub located at 314 West 11th Street (at Greenwich Street) in the West Village in Manhattan in New York City. The 100-seat gastropub was owned by Ken Friedman. Mario Batali was a primary investor. The chef was April Bloomfield, a British expatriate celebrity chef who was hired after flying to New York and interviewing with Mario Batali and Friedman. The restaurant held a single Michelin Star from about 2006 to 2016. The restaurant closed on January 26, 2020.

Sexual harassment and assault controversy
In December 2017, owner Ken Friedman was accused of multiple cases of sexual harassment in an article published in the New York Times. The authors interviewed many employees who said April Bloomfield was aware of his behavior, but did nothing to shield employees from it. The article included the statement that "several other employees say they also brought their complaints and concerns about Mr. Friedman to Ms. Bloomfield. Her response was always the same. 'That's who he is. Get used to it. Or go work for someone else'". April Bloomfield was also aware of her restaurant's third floor nickname, "the rape room". Mario Batali, an investor, was a frequent visitor and also accused of criminal behavior on the third floor. Friedman subsequently resigned from management duties of their restaurant group. Shortly after in December 2017, Bloomfield posted an apology on Twitter for not protecting her staff. On January 7, 2020, Ken Friedman agreed to pay $240,000 and 20% of his profits to former employees who accused him of sexual harassment and discrimination.

See also
 List of restaurants in New York City

References

Restaurants in Manhattan
Defunct restaurants in New York City
Gastropubs in the United States
West Village
2004 establishments in New York City
Restaurants established in 2004
Restaurants disestablished in 2020
2020 disestablishments in New York (state)